Paranoia! (or Paranoia) is a Czech conquest science fiction video game and a clone of Dune II. It was developed by Phoenix Arts in 1995 and distributed by Vision and later by MEC. It is the first Czech RTS. A sequel, Paranoia II, was released the following year.

Plot
The game's story is set in 2673 in the Beretta solar system on the planet Paranoia, where the Aponid war has continued for four years. The war began over one of the barren planet's few plants, the hopsinka, which has special powers. The player commands the Terrans, the native population, and strives to reclaim their territories.

Development
Paranoia was conceived as a project by Radek Ševčík. Ševčík wanted to make a better clone of Dune II as he didn't like some aspects of the game. Ševčík joined the Phoenix Arts team and started to work on the game. It was originally intended to be a freeware project but as the costs rose, the developers decided to release Paranoia as a commercial product. Paranoia was finished in February 1995 but developers decided to delay the release because they weren't satisfied with the game yet and continued to add new functions through the rest of development. The game was released in September 1995 after one year of development. Phoenix Arts released Paranoia II in 1996.

References

Bibliography

External links 

 Play online

1995 video games
North America-exclusive video games
Science fiction video games
Video games developed in the Czech Republic
Video games set in the 27th century
DOS games
DOS-only games
Real-time strategy video games
Multiplayer and single-player video games
Video game clones